is probably the most common type of traditional music of Brittany. It is a vocal tradition ( translates from Breton as, roughly, call and response singing). The style is the most commonly used to accompany dances. It has become perhaps the most integral part of the Breton roots revival, and was the first genre of Breton music to gain some mainstream success, both in Brittany and abroad.

The kaner sings a phrase, and the diskaner sings the last few lines with the kaner, then repeats it alone until the same last few lines, when the kaner again joins in. The phrase's repetition is changed slightly in each execution. Kan ha diskan can be songs about any subject, but must meet one of a number of a meters used in folk dances, mostly line or round. Vocables, or nonsense syllables (typically tra la la la leh no), are sometimes used to drag out lines. Usually a  lasts from 5 to 20 minutes.

In addition to the Goadecs, the singer Loeiz Ropars largely responsible for maintaining kan ha diskan's vitality in the middle of the 20th century, and the 1960s and 1970s revivalists drew largely on his work. During the folk revival, aspiring musicians sought out elder teachers to learn kan ha diskan from, generally being viewed as successful when the student can act as diskaner to his mentor. Teachers of this era included Marcel Guilloux and Yann-Fañch Kemener.

References 
 

Breton words and phrases
Breton music